.band may refer to:

 .band, a generic Internet top-level domain
 .band, the file format for GarageBand projects